Smith of Minnesota is a 1942 American drama film directed by Lew Landers and written by Robert Hardy Andrews. The film stars Bruce Smith, Arline Judge, Warren Ashe, Don Beddoe, Kay Harris and Robert Kellard. The film was released on October 15, 1942, by Columbia Pictures. It is based on University of Minnesota football player Bruce Smith, who won the Heisman Trophy in 1941 and who plays himself in this film.

Plot

Cast           
Bruce Smith as Himself
Arline Judge as Gwyn Allen
Warren Ashe as Charles Hardy
Don Beddoe as Lew Smith
Kay Harris as Olive Smith
Robert Kellard as George Smith
Roberta Smith as June Smith
Rosemary DeCamp as Mrs. Smith
Maurice Murphy as Wayne Smith
Dick Hogan as Gibby Dapper
Douglas Leavitt as Gus Boosalis
Alma Carroll as Edith
Edward Earle as Bill Glaser
Kenneth MacDonald as Doc Williams
Paul McVey as Coach
Addison Richards as Edward Northrup
Joel Friedkin as Kiekenapp
Harry Harvey Jr. as Young Bruce
Schuyler Standish as Young George

References

External links
 

1942 films
1940s biographical drama films
American biographical drama films
American black-and-white films
American football films
Biographical films about sportspeople
Columbia Pictures films
Cultural depictions of players of American football
Films directed by Lew Landers
Films set in Minnesota
Minnesota Golden Gophers football
1942 drama films
1940s English-language films
1940s American films